Forrest Mars may refer to:

Forrest Mars, Sr. (1904–1999), American businessman and one-time head of Mars, Incorporated
Forrest Mars, Jr. (1931–2016), his son

See also
 Mars (surname)
 Mars (disambiguation)